Carla Jean Martin (born November 26, 1954) is an American lawyer.

Family
Carla is the daughter of Charles W. Martin and Jean D. Henderson. She was born in Washington, D.C. and her family lived there until she was 9. Her father was an attorney who worked for the federal government in the 1950s until 1963 when he went into private practice in Tennessee, resulting in the family moving there. Her mother is a former government secretary and assistant.

Background

Martin graduated cum laude from the University of Tennessee at Knoxville. Martin earned her J.D. degree from the Washington College of Law at American University in Washington D.C. in 1989

Martin was admitted to the bar in Pennsylvania in 1990. She began working at the Federal Aviation Administration (FAA) during law school.

Martin's case, Public Citizen, Aviation Consumer Action Project, and Families of Pan Am 103 v. FAA, 988 F.2d 186 (D.C.Cir. 1993) is one of the seminal federal cases cited for FOIA Exemption 3, and for the protection and non-disclosure of sensitive security information (SSI). Martin was also responsible, as FAA counsel, for the Pan Am Flight 103/Lockerbie bombing case for several years, both the civil litigation trial in 1992 against Pan American World Airways in New York, as well as the criminal prosecution of the Lockerbie bomber defendants Megrahi and Fhimah in the Scottish court at Zeist, Netherlands in 2000. Ms. Martin's work in the civil litigation case is chronicled in the book by aviation security expert Rodney Wallis, Lockerbie: The Story and the Lessons.

Moussaoui trial

While working for the Federal Aviation Administration, Martin was assigned to the case of United States v. Zacarias Moussaoui and continued her work on that case after transferring to the Transportation Security Administration (TSA) in 2002. In June 2002, Martin assisted in drafting a motion and protective order to protect sensitive security information from being disclosed to defendant Moussaoui. See, Motion by USA as to Zacharias Moussaoui for Protective Order Prohibiting Disclosure of Sensitive Aviation Security Information to Defendant.

During the sentencing trial in March 2006, Judge Leonie Brinkema learned that Martin contacted seven FAA witnesses in an apparent violation of a court order. Martin denied any wrongdoing in connection with her work on the Moussaoui trial.

Roscoe Howard, former U.S. Attorney for the District of Columbia and Martin's attorney after the March 14th hearing had taken place, stated that "only her accusers' stories have been told, and those stories have been accepted as the whole truth." "They are not." The federal investigation concerning Martin's work in the case was dropped, without public comment or elaboration, in September 2006.

In April 2009, the Office of Professional Responsibility (OPR) of the Department of Justice, (DOJ) the office which investigates professional and ethical misconduct of lawyers within the Department, issued its final sanctions on the misconduct complaint filed with OPR against Assistant U.S. Attorney David J. Novak, prosecutor in the Moussaoui sentencing trial.  The sanctions were the result of an over one year long investigation into the events surrounding the Moussaoui prosecutors' failure of accountability in this matter,  as well as the many misrepresentations that were made to the court concerning Carla Martin's work in the case. OPR's finding was upheld that AUSA David Novak exercised "poor judgment"-a sanctionable offense- for failure to inform his witnesses and Ms. Martin- agency counsel working with AUSA Novak for 4 years on the case-at any time regarding the court's sequestration order which had been issued weeks before the trial started.  The judge had ordered the prosecutors both orally and through a written order issued on February 22, 2006, to inform their witnesses of the order. The sequestration order was different from Federal Rule of Evidence 615, the Rule Against Witnesses, as it went further than the generic Rule, as the court took pains to point out to the prosecutors in the March 13, 2006 hearing.  See, Moussaoui Trial Transcript, March 13, 2006.

Further, OPR determined that AUSA Novak exercised poor judgment by mischaracterizing Carla Martin's work in the prosecutors' filing to the court on March 15, 2006.

See also
Airline security 
Airport security repercussions due to the September 11, 2001 attacks 
Sensitive Security Information

References

Sources
Lockerbie: The Story and the Lessons. Rodney Wallis. Westport, Connecticut: Praeger/Greenwood, 2000. . 
Markon, Jerry. (2006) "Investigations, Lawsuits Still Dogging 9/11 Lawyer". The Washington Post. July 10, 2006. Found at  - Accessed January 8, 2008
''Letter from Office of Professional Responsibility United States Justice Department dated April 15, 2009, to attorney Larry J. Stein o/b/o Carla Martin; indicates findings of OPR and Office of Deputy Attorney General with regard to David J. Novak, Assistant U.S. Attorney;  United States v. Zacarias Moussaoui.

1954 births
People from Washington, D.C.
20th-century American lawyers
21st-century American lawyers
Washington College of Law alumni
University of Tennessee alumni
Living people
20th-century American women lawyers
21st-century American women lawyers